Metriorrhynchomiris is a genus of plant bugs in the family Miridae. There are at least three described species in Metriorrhynchomiris.

Species
These three species belong to the genus Metriorrhynchomiris:
 Metriorrhynchomiris dislocatus (Say, 1832)
 Metriorrhynchomiris fallax (Reuter, 1909)
 Metriorrhynchomiris illini (Knight, 1942)

References

Further reading

External links

 

Miridae genera
Articles created by Qbugbot
Mirini